Sir Robert Geoffrey Ellis, 1st Baronet (4 September 1874 in Shipley, West Yorkshire – 28 July 1956) was a Conservative Party politician in the United Kingdom.

Ellis was educated at Peterhouse, Cambridge. He was elected as Member of Parliament (MP) for Wakefield at the 1922 general election, but lost the seat at the 1923 general election.  He was re-elected in 1924, but defeated again in 1929.

Ellis did not contest Wakefield again, but at the 1931 general election he was returned as MP for Winchester. At the 1935 general election, he did not stand again in Winchester, but was elected instead for the Conservative safe seat of Sheffield Ecclesall. He retired from the House of Commons at the 1945 general election.

He was made a baronet, of Threshfield in the West Riding of the County of York, in 1932.

See also

References

External links 
 
 

1874 births
1956 deaths
Conservative Party (UK) MPs for English constituencies
Baronets in the Baronetage of the United Kingdom
UK MPs 1922–1923
UK MPs 1924–1929
UK MPs 1931–1935
UK MPs 1935–1945
Politics of Wakefield